Ecliptophanes is a genus of beetles in the family Cerambycidae, containing the following species:

 Ecliptophanes bucki (Melzer, 1934)
 Ecliptophanes chacunfrancozi (Tavakilian & Penaherrera-Leiva, 2003)
 Ecliptophanes laticornis (Melzer, 1922)
 Ecliptophanes scopipes (Zajciw, 1965)
 Ecliptophanes silvai (Zajciw, 1958)
 Ecliptophanes tommyi (Hovore, 1989)

References

Rhinotragini